Major General Eldon Wayne Joersz (born February 5, 1944) is an American pilot, who jointly holds the World Air Speed Record.

Joersz and Ltc George T. Morgan Jr. set the air speed record on July 28, 1976, in SR-71A Blackbird 61-7958 at Beale Air Force Base.

During his career in the United States Air Force, Joersz held several positions, including instructor for the T-38 Talon and SR-71, as a pilot during the Vietnam War in an F-105 Thunderchief from Takhli Royal Thai Air Force Base in Thailand; as well as Wing Commander of the 410 BW of the Eighth Air Force from May 1987 to May 1989 at K.I. Sawyer, AFB, Michigan, over Strategic Air Command's 307th and 46th Air Refueling Squadrons, and the 644th Bombardment Squadron.
 
His awards include the Defense Distinguished Service Medal, Legion of Merit, and the Defense Meritorious Service Medal, amongst others.

Joersz began his education in Hazen, North Dakota. From there, he graduated from North Dakota State University in 1966 with an ROTC commission and received his master's degree from Auburn University in 1978.  He retired from the Air Force in 1997.

References

External links
 Joersz bio

1944 births
Living people
Recipients of the Legion of Merit
United States Air Force generals
American aviators
American test pilots
Auburn University alumni
North Dakota State University alumni
Recipients of the Defense Distinguished Service Medal
American aviation record holders